OFK Mladenovac is a football club based in Mladenovac, Belgrade, Serbia. They compete in the Belgrade Zone League, the fourth tier of the national league system.

History
The original club became a member of the Belgrade Football Subassociation in 1924 under the name MSK Vojvoda Katić. They changed their name to FK Jedinstvo in 1945 following World War II and eventually to OFK Mladenovac in 1962. The club would reach the fourth tier of Yugoslav football in 1986 after winning the Belgrade Zone League.

At the beginning of the new millennium, the club won the Serbian League Belgrade in the 2000–01 season and took promotion to the Second League of FR Yugoslavia. They competed in Group East in their debut appearance in the second tier, finishing in third place. In the following 2002–03 season, the club was relegated back to the Serbian League Belgrade.

In 2005, the club placed first in the Serbian League Belgrade and earned promotion to the Serbian First League. They spent three seasons in the second tier, before suffering relegation back to the Serbian League Belgrade in 2008. The club would win the third-tier championship for the third time in 2011 to return to the Serbian First League.

After suffering a double relegation in 2012–13 and 2013–14, the club dropped to the Belgrade Zone League, the fourth tier of Serbian football. However, due to financial difficulties, they were forced to start the following 2014–15 season in the Mladenovac Municipal League, the sixth tier of the national league pyramid.

Honours
Serbian League Belgrade (Tier 3)
 2000–01, 2004–05, 2010–11
Belgrade Zone League (Tier 4)
 1997–98
Belgrade First League (Tier 5)
 2017–18 (Group C)
Mladenovac Municipal League (Tier 6)
 2014–15

Seasons

Notable players
This is a list of players who have played at full international level.
  Darko Božović
  Marko Simić
  Mario Đurovski
  Aleksandar Andrejević
  Stefan Panić
  Radivoje Manić
For a list of all OFK Mladenovac players with a Wikipedia article, see :Category:OFK Mladenovac players.

Managerial history

References

External links
 
 Club page at Srbijasport

 
1924 establishments in Serbia
Association football clubs established in 1924
Football clubs in Serbia
Football clubs in Belgrade
Mladenovac